Alexander Sergeevich Spirin (Russian: Александр Сергеевич Спирин) (4 September 1931 – 30 December 2020) was a Russian biochemist, Distinguished Professor at the Lomonosov Moscow State University (since 1999), a Director of Institute of Protein Research Russian Academy of Sciences, Puschino (Пущино-на-Оке), Moscow Region (Московская Область), Academician of Russian Academy of Sciences. His primary scientific interests in biochemistry included nucleic acids and protein biosynthesis.

Career 
In 1957 together with Andrey Nikolayevich Belozersky (Андрей Николаевич Белозерский) he conducted comparative analysis of bacterial DNA and RNA, and predicted existence of messenger RNA. He gave the first qualitative description of the structure of high-polymer RNA (1959–61). In 1963 he discovered structural transitions of ribosomes and formulated one of the principles of structure of ribosomes. He discovered artificial ribosomal self-assembly (1963–66) and proposed a molecular mechanism of the ribosome role in protein synthesis (1968). He conducted extra-cellular protein synthesis on modified ribosomes — non-enzymatic translation (together with L.P. Gavrilova) (1970–74).

In 1957, he defended his Candidate's Dissertation.
In 1962, he defended his doctoral dissertation.
In 1964, he received the title of Professor.
He was elected a corresponding member of the Academy of Sciences of the USSR in 1966 and full member in 1970.

Awards 
Dr. Spirin was awarded the Sir Hans Krebs Medal in 1969, elected an Honorary Fellow of University of Granada in 1972 and awarded the prestigious Demidov Prize in 2013. In 1974 he was elected a Member of the German Academy of Sciences Leopoldina. He was elected an International member of the American Philosophical Society in 1997 and a foreign associate of the US National Academy of Sciences in April 2019.

References 

1931 births
2020 deaths
Russian biochemists
Soviet biochemists
Molecular biologists
Academic staff of Moscow State University
Demidov Prize laureates
Members of the German Academy of Sciences Leopoldina
Members of Academia Europaea
Russian professors
Soviet professors
Members of the European Molecular Biology Organization
Foreign associates of the National Academy of Sciences
Moscow State University alumni
20th-century Russian scientists
21st-century Russian scientists
Members of the American Philosophical Society